Field Manor, located at 750 Field Manor Drive in Indianola on Merritt Island, Florida was added to the U.S. National Register of Historic Places on September 11, 1997, as the J.R. Field Homestead. It is one of the oldest standing structures on Merritt Island, dating to the 1880s. The property and structure now serve as a historic house museum.

History
John Moss Field first went to Florida in the 1830s during the Second Seminole War. Later, he moved with his wife Eliza and their family to Merritt island from Macon, Georgia in 1868. Within a year, the family returned to Macon, except for John Robert Field and Samuel Joseph Field, two sons of John and Eliza.

The house is roughly 3,500 square feet and is two stories.

Field Manor Foundation
Today, Field Manor is owned by Field Manor Foundation, a private 501(c)3 foundation created by Alma Clyde Field, the last Field family member to reside in the house. The homestead is open to the public as a historic house museum, having undergone two years of preservation and restoration. Everything in the house is original, from the furniture collection to the beadboard walls. The site also serves as an event venue.

References

National Register of Historic Places in Brevard County, Florida
Houses in Brevard County, Florida
Buildings and structures in Merritt Island, Florida
Museums in Brevard County, Florida